Maxim Aleshin (born 7 May 1979 in Ulyanovsk) is a Russian acrobat and former gymnast who won a bronze medal at the 2000 Summer Olympics in Sydney. He toured with the Moscow State Circus in the United Kingdom in 2008.

See also
List of Olympic male artistic gymnasts for Russia

References

External links
 

1979 births
Living people
Russian male artistic gymnasts
Olympic gymnasts of Russia
Olympic bronze medalists for Russia
Olympic medalists in gymnastics
Gymnasts at the 2000 Summer Olympics
Medalists at the 2000 Summer Olympics
Medalists at the World Artistic Gymnastics Championships
Sportspeople from Ulyanovsk